Rockford is a town in Spokane County, Washington, United States. The population was 470 at the 2010 census.

History
Rockford was first settled in 1878 by D.C. Farnsworth. The town took its name from a rocky ford on Rock Creek. Rockford was incorporated as a town in 1890.

Geography
Rockford is located at  (47.450891, -117.132870).

Demographics

2010 census
As of the census of 2010, there were 470 people, 192 households, and 136 families living in the town. The racial makeup of the town was 92.6% White, 0.4% African American, 3.0% Native American, 1.3% Asian, 1.7% from other races, and 1.1% from two or more races. Hispanic or Latino of any race were 3.0% of the population.

There were 192 households, of which 27.1% had children under the age of 18 living with them, 57.3% were married couples living together, 8.3% had a female householder with no husband present, 5.2% had a male householder with no wife present, and 29.2% were non-families. 20.8% of all households were made up of individuals, and 7.3% had someone living alone who was 65 years of age or older. The average household size was 2.45 and the average family size was 2.78.

The median age in the town was 44.9 years. 19.4% of residents were under the age of 18; 6.9% were between the ages of 18 and 24; 24% were from 25 to 44; 33.4% were from 45 to 64; and 16.2% were 65 years of age or older. The gender makeup of the town was 50.2% male and 49.8% female.

2000 census
As of the census of 2000, there were 413 people, 149 households, and 111 families living in the town. The population density was 607.1 people per square mile (234.5/km2). There were 169 housing units at an average density of 248.4 per square mile (96.0/km2). The racial makeup of the town was 97.34% White, 0.24% African American, 0.48% Native American, and 1.94% from two or more races. Hispanic or Latino of any race were 0.48% of the population.

There were 149 households, out of which 40.3% had children under the age of 18 living with them, 59.1% were married couples living together, 9.4% had a female householder with no husband present, and 25.5% were non-families. 20.8% of all households were made up of individuals, and 9.4% had someone living alone who was 65 years of age or older. The average household size was 2.77 and the average family size was 3.17.

In the town, the age distribution of the population shows 29.1% under the age of 18, 7.3% from 18 to 24, 26.9% from 25 to 44, 23.0% from 45 to 64, and 13.8% who were 65 years of age or older. The median age was 38 years. For every 100 females, there were 99.5 males. For every 100 females age 18 and over, there were 98.0 males.

The median income for a household in the town was $40,227, and the median income for a family was $45,125. Males had a median income of $31,339 versus $25,417 for females. The per capita income for the town was $16,411. About 11.9% of families and 12.1% of the population were below the poverty line, including 18.4% of those under age 18 and 3.6% of those age 65 or over.

See also

 List of towns in Washington (state)

References

External links

 

Towns in Spokane County, Washington
Towns in Washington (state)